Kenneth Oxford (14 November 1929 – 6 August 1993) was an English footballer. A goalkeeper, he played 296 league games in an 18-year career in the Football League. He spent time with Manchester City, Norwich City, Derby County, Doncaster Rovers, Port Vale, and Boston United. He helped Boston to win the West Midlands (Regional) League in the 1966–67 season.

Career
Oxford started his career by winning a contract at Manchester City, playing one First Division game at Maine Road in the 1947–48 season. He later had a non-playing spell at Chesterfield. He eventually ended up with Norwich City, who finished seventh in the Third Division South in 1953–54. Norman Low's "Canaries" finished in joint-11th place in 1954–55. Oxford was selected to play for the Third Division South representative side on 16 March 1955, and kept a clean sheet in a 2–0 victory over their Northern counterparts. Norwich then finished seventh in 1955–56, before finishing in last place in 1956–57. New boss Archie Macaulay then took Norwich to eighth spot in 1957–58. In his five years at Carrow Road, Oxford played 128 league games. He moved on to Derby County, who ended the 1958–59 campaign in seventh place in the Second Division. Harry Storer's "Rams" went on to finish 18th in 1959–60, 12th in 1960–61, and 16th in 1961–62. New manager Tim Ward took County to 18th in 1962–63 and 13th in 1963–64. During his five years at the Baseball Ground, Oxford made 151 league appearances. He spent the 1964–65 season with Bill Leivers's Doncaster Rovers, and made 16 Fourth Division in a brief stay at Belle Vue. In March 1965, he moved on to Jackie Mudie's Port Vale. He never played a game for the "Valiants", and remained on the sidelines as Jimmy O'Neill kept his first team place as the club were relegated out of the Third Division. He left Vale Park on a free transfer to Boston United in May 1965.

Post-retirement
After leaving the game, Oxford became a security guard. He died of a heart attack on 6 August 1993.

Career statistics
Source:

Honours
Boston United
West Midlands (Regional) League: 1966–67

References

People from Oldham
English footballers
Footballers from Oldham
Association football goalkeepers
Manchester City F.C. players
Chesterfield F.C. players
Norwich City F.C. players
Derby County F.C. players
Doncaster Rovers F.C. players
Port Vale F.C. players
Boston United F.C. players
English Football League players
1929 births
1993 deaths